Flaming Fury is a 1949 American crime film directed by George Blair and written by John K. Butler. The film stars George Cooper, Roy Roberts, Billy Wayne, Peter Brocco, David Wolfe and Paul Marion. The film was released on July 28, 1949, by Republic Pictures.

Plot

Cast    
George Cooper as Russ Haines
Roy Roberts as Capt. S. Taplinger
Billy Wayne as Sgt. 'Berk' Berkeley
Peter Brocco as E. V. Wessman
David Bauer as Tony Polacheck (as David Wolfe)
Paul Marion as Sam Polacheck
Ransom M. Sherman as Oscar Hollingsworth
Cliff Clark as Fire Engineer Robby Rollins
Celia Lovsky as Bertha Polacheck
Jimmie Dodd as Kenneth Bender
G. Pat Collins as Battalion Fire Chief

References

External links 
 

1949 films
American crime films
1949 crime films
Republic Pictures films
Films directed by George Blair
American black-and-white films
1940s English-language films
1940s American films